The Kent and Sharpshooters Yeomanry was a unit of the Territorial Army ('TA') that was formed in 1961 as the Kent and County of London Yeomanry (Sharpshooters) by the amalgamation of 297 (Kent Yeomanry) Regiment, Royal Artillery and 3rd/4th County of London Yeomanry (Sharpshooters).

History
The unit was formed in 1961 as the Kent and County of London Yeomanry (Sharpshooters) by the amalgamation of two yeomanry regiments, the 297 (Kent Yeomanry) Regiment, Royal Artillery and the 3rd/4th County of London Yeomanry (Sharpshooters). It served initially as an armoured reconnaissance regiment until 1967 and the re-organisation of the TA, when it was disbanded and reconstituted as three separate units:
'C' Squadron, Royal Yeomanry
'R' Battery, The London and Kent Regiment, Royal Artillery
'A' Company, 8th Battalion, the Queen's Regiment

In 1969, the artillery battery was converted to (265 London & Kent) Squadron, part of 71 (Yeomanry) Signal Regiment, the Royal Signals. In 1971, this squadron was re-designated 265 (Kent and County of London Yeomanry) Squadron in 1971 and in 1987 the lineage was transferred to HQ (Kent and County of London Yeomanry) Squadron, part of 71 (Yeomanry) Signal Regiment.

Present day

Today two squadrons retain the Sharpshooters name:

'C' (Kent and Sharpshooters Yeomanry) Squadron Royal Yeomanry.
 265 (Kent & County of London Yeomanry (Sharpshooters)) Support Squadron, 71 (City of London) Yeomanry Signal Regiment.

Regimental museum
The Kent and Sharpshooters Yeomanry Museum is at Hever Castle in Kent.

Honorary Colonels
Honorary colonels have been:
Colonel John Nevill, 5th Marquess of Abergavenny 1961-1962
Major-General George Philip Bradley Roberts 1962-1970	
Colonel Sir William John Herbert de Wette Mullens 1970-1974
Major-General The Rt. Hon. Gilbert Monckton, 2nd Viscount Monckton of Brenchley 1974-1979
Lieutenant Robin Leigh-Pemberton, Baron Kingsdown 1979-1992
Brigadier Sir Arthur Gooch 1992-2000
Lieutenant-Colonel Julian Radcliffe 2000-2013
Colonel Rt Hon Sir Nicholas Soames 2013-

See also
County of London Yeomanry

Lineage

|- style="text-align: center; background: #444C38;"
| style="text-align:center;" colspan="3"|
|-
| width="33%" rowspan="4" align="center" | Kent and Sharpshooters Yeomanry
| width="33%" rowspan="2" align="center" | 297th (Kent Yeomanry) Light Anti-Aircraft Regiment
| width="33%" align="center" | Royal East Kent Mounted Rifles (Duke of Connaught's Own)
|-
| width="33%" align="center" | Queen's Own West Kent Yeomanry
|-
| width="33%" rowspan="2" align="center" | 3rd/4th County of London Yeomanry (Sharpshooters)
| width="33%" align="center" | 3rd County of London Yeomanry (Sharpshooters)
|-
| width="33%" align="center" | 4th County of London Yeomanry (Sharpshooters)

References

Bibliography
 
 Mollo, Boris, (1970). The Sharpshooters. The 3rd County of London Yeomanry and successor units 1900-1961. Kent and County of London Yeomanry 1961-1970, Historical Research Unit, London.

External links
C (KSY) Squadron, Royal Yeomanry
265 (KCLY) Support Squadron, Royal Signals
KSY Museum
KSY Association

Yeomanry regiments of the British Army
Military units and formations established in 1961
Military units and formations in Kent
1961 establishments in the United Kingdom
Military units and formations in London